Fergal O'Brien (born 8 March 1972) is an Irish professional snooker player who plays on the main professional tour since 1991. Ranked within the world's top 64 players from 1994 to 2022, he has reached his highest position of 9th in the 2000–01 season. He has won one ranking title, the 1999 British Open, defeating Anthony Hamilton 9–7 in the final. He has reached two other major finals, notably the 2001 Masters, where he lost 9–10 to Paul Hunter. O'Brien was relegated from the professional tour after losing to 15-year-old Welsh amateur Liam Davies in the 2022 World Snooker Championship qualifying rounds. However, he regained his professional status immediately by coming through Event 1 of Q School.

Career
O'Brien is, along with Yan Bingtao, one of only two players to score a century in their first frame at the World Championships in the Crucible, which he achieved against Alan McManus in 1994 (though he lost the match 10–7 and did not qualify again until 1998). His greatest achievement was winning the British Open in 1999, beating Anthony Hamilton 9–7 in the final. Hamilton opened with two centuries, but O'Brien won five frames on the final black to defeat the Nottingham man.

O'Brien also came close to winning the Masters title in 2001. After beating Mark Williams, Ken Doherty and Dave Harold, he lost in the final to Paul Hunter after leading 7–3. He has reached one further ranking final, and three semi-finals

O'Brien peaked at No. 9 in the rankings following his sole title, but nosedived after this. He narrowly retained his top 16 place for the 2001/2002 season, but dropped out a year later – and then out of the top 32 a year later. Three further falls down the rankings left him at No. 45, before beginning to recover.

O'Brien's best run at the World Championship is the quarter-final and 2005 he became the first player to beat John Parrott in a World Championship qualifier.

O'Brien started the 2007–08 campaign in Shanghai where he had beaten Paul Davies and Barry Hawkins in qualifying rounds, however, he lost to Steve Davis in the first round. O'Brien also qualified for the Grand Prix but lost four of his group matches to finish 5th in his group ahead of only Graeme Dott.

After qualifying for the main draw of the 2007 Northern Ireland Trophy by beating Barry Pinches in a deciding frame, O'Brien went on to beat Dave Harold in the first round of the main draw. Victories over John Higgins (in a decider), Barry Hawkins and Ronnie O'Sullivan, before he reached the second ranking-event final of his career by beating Mark Allen by 6 frames to 3. He lost the final to Stephen Maguire, 5–9. This run helped him return to the top 32 of the Snooker world rankings 2007/2008, but the early part of the 2008–09 season proved disappointing, O'Brien not reaching the last sixteen of any of the first four tournaments.

As of the end of 2009 O'Brien had compiled 101 competitive century breaks in his career.

He qualified for the Players Tour Championship 2011/2012 – Finals held in Galway but lost his Last 24 match 0–4 to Joe Perry.

On 12 April 2017,  O’Brien qualified for the 2017 World Snooker Championship after a record-breaking victory in the final qualifying round match against David Gilbert. The final frame set the record for the longest frame of the modern era, lasting 123 minutes and 41 seconds.

Performance and rankings timeline

Career finals

Ranking finals: 2 (1 title)

Minor-ranking finals: 1

Non-ranking finals: 9 (2 titles)

Team finals: 1

References

External links
 
Fergal O'Brien at worldsnooker.com

1972 births
Irish snooker players
Bayside, Dublin
Living people